Although the first Olympic coin can be traced back to 480 BC, the modern Olympics did not see its first commemoratives until 1951. The original concept of Olympic coins was that the Greeks believed that coins brought the general public closer to the Olympic games. The premise was that those who could not attend the games could at least have a tangible souvenir of the event.

In 1951, the government of Finland authorized the striking of the first modern Olympic coin, a 500 Markkaa.  At first, the coins circulated as currency in the issuing country and the mintages were high. In borrowing from the traditions of ancient Greece, the coins were a memento of the 1951 Games, and a coin that numismatists could now add to their collection. With the exception of Canada's Lucky Loonie program and its 2007 25-cent pieces to commemorate the 2010 Vancouver Olympic Games, it is rare that Olympic coins are minted for circulation. Traditionally, Olympic coins are numismatic coins.

Summer Games

1952 Helsinki Olympics

Specifications

Dimensions

1964 Tokyo Olympics

100 Yen
Specifications

Dimensions

1000 Yen
Specifications

Dimensions

1968 Mexico City Olympics

Specifications

Dimensions

1972 Munich Olympics
During the release of the first four series, a controversy was generated over the legend. The use of the legend, “IN DEUTSCHLAND” was a point of tension for East Germany. The point was raised that the legend should have read “In München”. The legend was changed for Series Five.

Series One
Specifications

Dimensions

Series Two
Specifications

Dimensions

Series Three
Specifications

Dimensions

Series Four
Specifications

Dimensions

Series Five
Specifications

Dimensions

Series Six
Specifications

Dimensions

1976 Montreal Olympics
Starting in February 1973, the RCM engaged in a very ambitious program. At the behest of the Federal Government, led by then-Prime Minister Pierre Elliott Trudeau, it was agreed that these coins would help finance while commemorate the 1976 Summer Olympics. An Official Act – The Olympic (1976) Act – authorized the issue of the legal tender coins.

The plan was to have thirty coins: twenty-eight sterling (.925) silver coins with face values of $5 and $10, containing .723 Troy ounce and 1.44 Troy ounce of silver each respectively, and two gold coins. These coins would be categorized into seven series with each series configured into four coin sets (two five dollar coins and two ten dollar coins). The seven series were constituted as follows:

 Geographic
 Olympic Motifs
 Early Canadian Sports
 Olympic Track and Field Sports 
 Olympic Summer Sports
 Olympic Team and Body Contact Sports
 Olympic Souvenirs

Series 1

Series 2

Series 3

Series 4

Series 5

Series 6

Series 7

100 Dollar Gold

1980 Moscow Olympics
IN PROGRESS
The Moscow Olympics were the first Olympic games to be held in a socialist country. An Act of the Soviet government authorized the Ministry of Finance and the State Bank of the USSR to issue a 28-coin collection of five and ten roubles in proof and uncirculated qualities. There was also six proof and six uncirculated gold 100 roubles, five proof and five uncirculated platinum 150 roubles, and six proof and six uncirculated 1 rouble coins.

1 Rouble
The dimensions are the same for all 1 Rouble coins. 
Dimensions

Specifications

Series One (Geographic)
The dimensions are the same for all the Series One Five Roubles coins. 
Dimensions

Specifications

The dimensions are the same for all the Series One Ten Roubles coins. 
Dimensions

Specifications

Series Two – Citius
Five Roubles
The dimensions are the same for all the Series Two Five Roubles coins. 
Dimensions

Specifications

Ten Roubles
The dimensions are the same for all the Series Two Ten Roubles coins. 
Dimensions

Specifications

Series Three – Altius
Five Roubles
The dimensions are the same for all the Series Three Five Roubles coins. 
Dimensions

Specifications

Ten Roubles
The dimensions are the same for all the Series Three Ten Roubles coins. 
Dimensions

Specifications

Series Four – Fortius
Five Roubles
The dimensions are the same for all the Series Four Five Roubles coins. 
Dimensions

Specifications

Ten Roubles
The dimensions are the same for all the Series Four Ten Roubles coins. 
Dimensions

Specifications

Series Five – Sports and Beauty
Five Roubles
The dimensions are the same for all the Series Five Five Roubles coins. 
Dimensions

Specifications

Ten Roubles
The dimensions are the same for all the Series Five Ten Roubles coins. 
Dimensions

Specifications

Series Six – Team Sports
Five Roubles
The dimensions are the same for all the Series Six Five Roubles coins. 
Dimensions

Specifications

Ten Roubles
The dimensions are the same for all the Series Six Ten Roubles coins. 
Dimensions

Specifications

100 Roubles
The dimensions are the same for all the 100 Roubles coins. 
Dimensions

Specifications

150 Roubles
The dimensions are the same for all the 150 Roubles coins. 
Dimensions

Specifications

1984 Los Angeles Olympics

The State of California and the municipality refused to finance the Games. The U.S.S.R. refused to participate in the games as well. Legislation from July 22, 1982 authorized an issue of Olympic coins. The Bill allowed the striking of six coins bearing three different designs. The United States struck its first Olympic coins ever, and its first gold coin in fifty years. Uncirculated Coins were produced at the United States Mint’s facilities in Denver, Philadelphia, San Francisco and West Point.

One Dollar
Dimensions

Specifications

Ten Dollars
Dimensions

Specifications

1988 Seoul Games

Specifications

1000 Won

2000 Won

5000 Won

10,000 Won

25,000 Won

50,000 Won

Series One

Series Two

Series Three

Series Four

1992 Barcelona Games

Dimensions

25 Pesetas
Specifications

Spanish Art
 Series One

Series Two

Olympic Spirit
 Series One

 Series Two

Spanish Tradition
 Series One

 Series Two

1996 Atlanta Games

Half Dollar

One Dollar

Five Dollars

Centennial Olympic Coin Program, 1992-1996

As 1996 marked the centennial of the first modern Olympic games held in Athens, a series of five gold and ten silver coins were struck by five countries: Canada, Australia, France. Austria, and Greece. The concept for the program was first discussed in 1986 and 1987. The Royal Canadian Mint held the view that the Centennial of the modern Olympic Games should be commemorated. The International Olympic Committee was approached on the idea and five Mints were invited to participate in the program. This marked the first time that the International Olympic Committee participated in an international commemorative coin program.

References

Sources

Citations

Olympics, Modern
Coins, Modern
+